U.S. Army Garrison Bavaria (USAG Bavaria) is a US Army garrison headquartered in Grafenwöhr, Germany, with four locations, which include Grafenwöhr (Tower Barracks), Vilseck (Rose Barracks), Hohenfels (Hohenfels Training Area) and Garmisch (George C. Marshall Center and NATO School), along with Grafenwöhr Training Area Camps.

History

Garrison 

In 2013, U.S. Army Garrison Grafenwöhr was transformed to U.S. Army Garrison Bavaria, a single garrison. In February 2017, in response to the growing rotational force and training troop presence, U.S. Army Garrison Bavaria established the 5th Community to "manage garrison resources in the training camps, deconflict infrastructure and facilities usage, and ensure the efficient operation and integration of garrison support to deployment, sustainment, and redeployment operations."

Commanders 

 * Commanders of the U.S. Army Garrison Bavaria (formerly 100th Area Support Group and U.S. Army Garrison Grafenwöhr)

Mission 

U.S. Army Garrison Bavaria is the largest U.S. base outside of the United States and hosts 40,000 soldiers and civilians. The garrison's mission is to provide a "high-quality base operations and community support" to all U.S. personnel in Grafenwöhr-Vilseck, Hohenfels and Garmisch. The garrison also directly supports the 7th Army Training Command (the largest training command outside the continental United States), the Combat Maneuver Training Command, 2nd Cavalry Regiment and several other tenant units.

Post and training information

Grafenwöhr and Vilseck 

The Grafenwöhr Training Area (GTA) was created following the activation of the III Royal Bavarian Corps in 1900 and in 1908, the training area was officially designated as "Training Area Grafenwöhr". After the Nazis took power, the Wehrmacht used the training area for military training and guarded enemy prisoners of war. After WWII, U.S. Army Europe expanded the role and importance of the training area to meet the increased training needs, and also increased the facilities to support the troops during training. A large build-up of Rose Barracks, Vilseck occurred in the mid 1980s with the construction of facilities to support a brigade size element which is now home to the 2nd Cavalry Regiment. 2001 brought the start of a build-up of Tower Barracks (Formerly East Camp) with new construction, realignment, and renovations to support a Brigade Combat Team (BCT), which was completed in 2012 and now houses two 173rd ABCT Battalions and supports  Regionally Aligned Forces (RAF), in support of the  European Deterrence Initiative (EDI). With the establishment of the training area, Grafenwöhr and its subdivisions Gmuend, Huetten, and Goeßenreuth lost 2,820 hectares, meaning two-thirds of its real estate, as well as a portion of its back country. 

Nevertheless, the military caused a consistent economic growth in the city Grafenwöhr. The number of inhabitants doubled between 1909 and 1910, from 961 to 1,841. In 2010, Grafenwöhr had 6,550 inhabitants. Since 2010, the fluctuating development of Grafenwöhr has been closely connected to the development of the training area. The Water Tower joined the city's original landmark, the gothic town hall built in 1462. With 232 km², it is the largest NATO training facility in Europe today, providing vast ranges, simulation centers, classrooms and facilities for realistic and relevant training to U.S. Army, Joint Service, NATO and allied units and leaders.

Former Villages 

Approximately 250 residents of ten villages, farms and hamlets had to leave their homes between 1907 and 1910 as a result of the establishment of the training area. During the large expansion of the training area to its current size in 1938, 3.500 residents of 57 villages, farms and hamlets were resettled. The families were moved to other communities in all parts of Bavaria, where they were given houses and land or were financially compensated. The resettlement was organized by the Reich's Resettlement Corporation (RUGES), allegedly with pressure from the Third Reich. Hopfenohe, Pappenberg and Haag were the three largest villages back in the time. After WWII, the villages were released for the removal of building materials. Only a few remnants of the walls, vaulted cellars, wells, remains of churches, chapels and cemeteries bear witness to the former villages.

Hohenfels 

The Hohenfels Training Area (HTA) is named after the market town of Hohenfels. The German Army founded the training area in Hohenfels in 1938. In 1951, it became a U.S. Forces training area and was used primarily by U.S. Forces. In 1988, Hohenfels Training Area became the home of the Combat Manoeuvre Training Center (CMTC), with the mission to provide realistic force-on-force combined arms training exercises for the U.S. Army Europe and 7th Army's manoeuvre battalion task forces. Combat Manoeuvre Training Center was transformed and officially named the Joint Multinational Readiness Center in December 2005. It is the largest U.S. Army Europe manoeuvre training area. In May 2014, U.S. Army Garrison Hohenfels became a U.S. Army Garrison Bavaria community.

Garmisch 
The Garmisch Military Post and Garmisch Recreation Center, which operated a variety of hotels and outdoor sports facilities, were established in 1946 and based in the installations of the German Army's 1st Mountain Division. In 1947, Garmisch became home to the U.S. Army Russian Institute and in 1953 the NATO School opened its doors in nearby Oberammergau cementing the community's role as a center for both military education and U.S. Forces Recreation over the past 68 years. In 1993 the U.S. Army Russian Institute was replaced by the George C. Marshall European Center for Security Studies, and by 2004, all Armed Forces Recreation Center Hotel operations had been consolidated into the Edelweiss Lodge and Resort. Today, the George C. Marshall Center and NATO School provide essential forums for international military diplomacy, education and cooperation, while the Edelweiss Lodge and Resort has become the focal point for armed forces recreation in Europe. In July 2012, the support elements that had evolved over 68 years to become U.S. Army Garrison Garmisch inactivated, and Garmisch became a U.S. Army Garrison Bavaria community.

Current Command Group 

 U.S. Army Garrison Commander: Col. Kevin A. Poole
 U.S. Army Garrison Deputy Commander: Mr. Michael Daniels
 U.S. Army Garrison Command Sergeant Major: Command Sgt. Maj. Hermes F. Acevedo

Units

Tower Barracks - Grafenwöhr 
 Charlie Company 1-214 Aviation Battalion 
 7th Army Training Command
 106th Financial Management Support Unit
 18th Combat Sustainment Support Battalion
 1st Inland Cargo Transfer Company
 702nd Explosive Ordnance Disposal Company
 44th Expeditionary Signal Battalion
 1st Squadron, 91st Cavalry Regiment
 4th Battalion, 319th Field Artillery Regiment
 41st Field Artillery Brigade
 15th Engineer Battalion
 928th Contracting Battalion
 534th Engineer Detachment
 18th Military Police Brigade
 709th Military Police Battalion
 615th Military Police Company
 131st Military Working Dog Detachment
 457th Civilian Affairs Battalion
 1172nd Movement Control Team
 102nd Signal Battalion
 66th Military Intelligence Brigade
 39th Transportation Battalion
 928th Contracting Battalion (Regional Contracting Office)
 7th Weather Squadron, Detachment 2

Rose Barracks - Vilseck 

 2nd Cavalry Regiment
 1st Squadron, 2nd Cavalry Regiment
 2nd Squadron, 2nd Cavalry Regiment
 3rd Squadron, 2nd Cavalry Regiment
 4th Squadron, 2nd Cavalry Regiment
 Regimental Engineer Squadron, 2nd Cavalry Regiment
 Fires Squadron, 2nd Cavalry Regiment
 Regimental Support Squadron, 2nd Cavalry Regiment
 2nd Cavalry Regiment Reed Museum
 102nd Signal Battalion
 2nd Air Support Operations Squadron
 39th Transportation Battalion

Hohenfels 

 1st Battalion, 4th Infantry Regiment
 4th Platoon, 3rd Battalion, 58th Aviation Regiment
 527th MP Company

Garmisch 

 George C. Marshall European Center

German American Volksfest 

Every first weekend in August more than 100,000 people come to Camp Kasserine on the Grafenwöhr Training Area. For more than fifty years, the U.S. Army Garrison Bavaria and the German American Community Council (GACC) invite guests to celebrate the German American Volksfest. Many rides and booths, a large beer tent and a tent city with sales booths offering a large variety of international, culinary delicacies. Bands, music groups and performances entertain the guests. The main attraction is the large weapons display with German and American tanks and other military vehicles. 2018 marked the 60th anniversary of the German American Volksfest.

Controversy 

Pristine nature and landscapes, an extraordinary diversity of species, weapons’ deployments, fascinating technical equipment and beautiful sunsets show the beautiful aspect of the training area. For 100 years, the area has been intensively used as a military training area for various military weapons and a large variety of types of ammunition. Military training, technical developments and the carefree throw-away-mentality have left behind waste and pollution. Much of that was repaired over the past years. However, there are disadvantages concerning the economic impact of living with and from the training area. A negative impact due to firing and flight noise pollution, more traffic, emissions and immissions, higher rental prices on the public real estate market, a one-sided economic dependency and many more aspects that can be looked at critically.

See also 
 7th Army Training Command
 2nd Cavalry Regiment (United States)

References

External links 
 U.S. Army Garrison Bavaria
 Bavarian News
 U.S. Army Europe
 IMCOM-Europe

United States Army posts